Alexander Iolas (March 26, 1908 – June 8, 1987) was an Egyptian-born Greek-American art gallerist and an significant collector of modern art works, who advanced the careers of René Magritte and many other artists. He established the modern model of the global art business, operating successful galleries in Paris, Geneva, Milan and New York.

Biography
Iolas was born on March 26, 1908, in Alexandria, Egypt, under the name Constantine Coutsoudis, to a well-off family of cotton traders. However, from an early age, Iolas showed an inclination towards the arts and consequently, in 1928, he moved to Athens, Greece. There, Iolas began to associate with an artistic circle of people such as Kostis Palamas and Angelos Sikelianos, who would play a mentoring role in his life, as well as Eva Palmer-Sikelianos. It was in Athens that Iolas took his first steps in dancing.

In 1930, upon the urging of Dimitris Mitropoulos, Iolas moved to Berlin where he devoted himself to dance studies. He attended the school of Tatjana and Victor Gsovsky and participated in the Salzburg Festival in 1931 and 1932.

In November 1932, Iolas moved to Paris where he continued studying ballet with some well-known teachers, and also attended art classes at the Sorbonne.

In 1935, Iolas went to New York. There, on December 14, 1935, he signed a contract with the Ballet Productions dance troupe and made his debut at the Metropolitan Opera House, dancing in La Traviata.

On November 19, 1945, Iolas became a naturalized American citizen and signed as Constantine Coutsoudis. His official name change took place later. The restructuring of Iolas' name was an invention of his; he had already appeared as 'Jolas Coutsoudis' in theatrical programs since 1931, long before he went to America. The name 'Iolas' gradually replaced his actual surname as it was more euphonic, with only two-syllables and therefore easier to pronounce. Mainly, though, it was symbolic since it was associated with Iolaus, a glorious figure of Greek Mythology. 'Alexander' is also a glorious name, closely related to the city in which Iolas was born.

In 1945, Iolas decided to give up dancing and explore a way to transition to art. It was rumored that this transition was due to an injury, but the truth is that, at 37 years old, he considered himself to be "too old for dancing."

On September 1, 1945, Iolas's first gallery, the Hugo Gallery, was officially established in New York, named in honor of François Hugo, the last spouse of Donna Maria Ruspoli who was a close friend of Iolas. He started by exhibiting works of European surrealist artists, such as René Magritte, Max Ernst, Giorgio de Chirico, and Victor Brauner. There, in 1952, Iolas also presented Andy Warhol's first exhibition. He later collaborated with the New Realists (Niki de Saint Phalle, Jean Tinguely, Martial Raysse, et al.), with Arte Povera artists (Jannis Kounellis, Pino Pascali et al.) and many others. In 1954, the gallery expanded and was renamed 'Alexander Iolas, Inc'.

Iolas was one of the pioneers in the development of a "network" of art galleries, satellites of a central art gallery, by opening new Alexander Iolas Galleries in Geneva (1963), Paris (1964), Milan (1966), Zurich, Madrid and Rome. At the same time, he promoted Greek artists abroad, such as Nikos Hadjikyriakos-Ghikas, Vagis, Moralis and Tsarouchis. He also collaborated with the younger generation of Greek artists, such as Kostas Tsoklis, Pavlos, Takis, Akrithakis, Fassianos and Mara Karetsos, who had already started a career abroad.

Iolas also published art catalogues, prefaced by, among others, André Breton and Pierre Restany, as well as collectible books of artists and poets in a limited number of copies (Max Ernst, Giannis Ritsos, Odysseas Elytis et al.). He donated artworks to large museums, such as the Metropolitan Museum of Art and the Museum of Modern Art in New York, the Georges Pompidou Center in Paris (donations in 1977), as well as the National Art Gallery of Athens (donation in 1971).

Having obtained worldwide fame, Iolas often said that he would return to Greece in order to contribute to the progress of its artistic life. The fall of the Greek junta in 1974 had paved the way for this. He gradually closed down all his galleries but the one in New York, thus keeping his promise to Marx Ernst, to stop when he died. The fact that, during the '70s, many artists from the old guard died, people by whom Iolas had been nurtured and for whom he had deep love and respect, must have also played a significant role in his decision. In Greece, he collaborated with various galleries, such as the Zoumboulakis–Iolas Gallery, Medusa, Vicky Drakos, Athens Art Gallery, Skoufa et al.

From 1985 until his death in 1987, Iolas was treated with mistrust and malice from a large portion of the Greek press that created a vulgar image of him. He was even accused of illicit trade in antiquities, a case that did not reach the courts because of his death, while all other accusations were dropped as groundless. On the initiative of Costas Gavras, there has been, from abroad, an attempt to defend Iolas, which was co-signed by many internationally-recognized personalities, such as the Byzantinologist Helene Glykatzi-Ahrweiler.

In 1984, Iolas donated 47 works of contemporary art from his personal collectionto the Macedonian Museum of Contemporary Art, while he promised to donate more works. 

Also in 1984, he commissioned Warhol to do a series of paintings after Leonardo da Vinci's The Last Supper. The works premiered in Milan just months before both men's deaths.

Iolas died from AIDS-related complications at New York Hospital on June 8, 1987. A memorial service was held on September 17, 1987, at the Archdiocesan Cathedral of the Holy Trinity, New York.

Iolas's long-term partner, André Mourgues, said: "Iolas was someone completely positive, he loved everything, and he loved everyone, within reason, he was so positive in his love of life. But, above all else, his real religion was art." Following Iolas's death, Mourgues lived with the remainder of his collection in Paris. The Villa Iolas in Athens, a marble palace that Iolas had built and which he hoped would become a museum, was looted and fell into ruins after his death, the Greek government never acting upon his wishes.

References

External links

 Angelis Films Ltd, Βίλα Ιόλα, Ταξίδι στον Χώρο και Χρόνο [in Greek]
 Περιοδικό «Κ» - Βίλα Ιόλα: Ή τώρα ή ποτέ. Μαργαρίτα Πουρναρά, 03/07/2018 [in Greek]
 Αρχείο της ΕΡΤ: Εικαστικά, Αλέξανδρος Ιόλας [in Greek]
 ΕΡΤ: Η Μηχανή του Χρόνου, Αλέξανδρος Ιόλας, 02/08/2017 [in Greek]
 Macedonian Museum of Contemporary Art
 Zoumboulakis Galleries
 Alexander Iolas dance-theatre producer Antiques A Society Favorite's many talents, The New York Times, December 4, 1998
 "Teddy Roosevelt's granddaughter does a cancan at a casino in Rio," Life magazine, September 7, 1942, pages 102-105. Retrieved March 22, 2011
 Brooks Jackson on Alexander Iolas, March 22, 1976 interview by Paul Cummings, Smithsonian Archives of American Art
 The Guardian - Magritte on Magritte René Magritte's instructions to New York dealer, February 6, 2011
 Clement Greenberg in My Studio by Jules Olitski, 1994 Retrieved February 4, 2010
 Alexander Iolas, the Greek art dealer, was seen in a floor-length raccoon coat, throwing bills in the air Inside Art The New York Times, July 2, 1993
 Collection Overview Archived 2011-02-24 at the Wayback Machine The Menil Collection
 "New York Studio"
 "Galerie Samy Kinge". Retrieved 2020-03-14
 "Andy Warhol - The Last Supper, Ayn Foundation"the original. Retrieved 2011-03-22
 Alexander Iolas in Athens The ACG Art Collection

1908 births
1987 deaths
People from Alexandria
American art dealers
Greek art dealers
American art collectors
Greek art collectors
Former private collections
Egyptian people of Greek descent
Naturalized citizens of the United States
Egyptian expatriates in Germany
Egyptian expatriates in France
Egyptian emigrants to the United States
AIDS-related deaths in New York (state)